John Holt Todd (29 April 1879 – 27 September 1960) was an Australian rules footballer who played with St Kilda and South Melbourne in the Victorian Football League (VFL).

Todd moved to Queensland after his playing career was over. He became a farmer and a bookmaker in the ensuing years.

References

External links 

1879 births
1960 deaths
Australian rules footballers from Melbourne
St Kilda Football Club players
Sydney Swans players
Footscray Football Club (VFA) players
Brighton Football Club players
People from Prahran, Victoria